Pujiang Town is a station on Line 8 of the Shanghai Metro. This station is part of the southern extension of Line 8 and opened on July 5, 2009.

References

 陈行路站建设用地规划许可证 
 东方网上海频道(2007年12月11日) - 浦东轨交"新四线"2009年底全建成 动迁已基本完成 
 文新传媒：轨交8号线还要往南延伸到航天公园站 

Railway stations in Shanghai
Shanghai Metro stations in Minhang District
Line 8, Shanghai Metro
Railway stations in China opened in 2009